Shamshi-Adad III was the King of Assyria from  1563 BC to 1548 BC. He was the son of Ishme-Dagan II. He is known from an inscription where he reports having repaired two of the ziggurats.

References

16th-century BC Assyrian kings
Year of birth unknown

Year of death unknown